The Disney Channel television series Gravity Falls created by Alex Hirsch features an extensive cast of characters. All of the characters listed have appeared in the first and second seasons.

Overview

Main 
 Dipper Pines (voiced by Jason Ritter) is the 12-year-old (13-year-old at the end of the series) twin brother of Mabel Pines, born 5 minutes after Mabel. He is armed with the journal marked "3" that he discovered in the woods. It has helped him solve the countless mysteries of Gravity Falls. As an adventurer, Dipper has trouble sitting still and is always looking for the next riddle to solve, leaving him restless in mundane situations. His attention to detail seems helpful when solving mysteries, but others question his credibility because of his zeal. He is considered wise beyond his years and cannot wait to grow up and become a man. Portrayed as goal-oriented and rooted in the facts, he sometimes overthinks possible scenarios and obsessively makes lists, which also makes him much more perceptive of the real danger Gravity Falls faces. Between seasons, Dipper hosted a series titled "Dipper's Guide to the Unexplained". It is revealed in one of the episodes that Dipper has a crush on Wendy. While he knows in his heart that he will never really be Wendy's boyfriend, that does not stop him from doing everything he can to please her. In another episode, it is revealed that he likes bubblegum pop music. He got his nickname from a birthmark on his forehead that is shaped like the Big Dipper. His formal name was never revealed during the series but was later revealed to be Mason in the release of Journal 3.
 Mabel Pines (voiced by Kristen Schaal) is the 12-year-old (13-year-old at the end of the series) twin sister of Dipper Pines, born 5 minutes before Dipper. Mabel is an eccentric, buoyant, and energetic optimist who expresses herself through an assortment of colorful knitted sweaters, as well as her skills in various arts and crafts. Her outgoing, curious personality often helps Dipper solve mysteries, though her silliness is often seen as a burden. Mabel enjoys preteen novels and seeks romance (especially in vampires). Despite what she sees as dating obscurity in Gravity Falls, Mabel stays optimistic. She once went on a date with Li'l Gideon but broke it off quickly when she realized that Gideon was dangerous and nearly killed her brother. In the episode "Irrational Treasure," she is made an official U.S. congresswoman by the eighth-and-a-half president, Quentin Trembley, with a political platform of "legalize everything". She wins a pet pig in the episode "The Time Traveler's Pig" and names it Waddles. She also makes guest appearances in "Dipper's Guide to the Unexplained" but has her own series titled "Mabel's Guide to Life". Both of these shows aired in between seasons. Mabel is inspired by Alex Hirsch's own twin sister, Ariel.
 Grunkle Stan (voiced by Alex Hirsch as an adult and Declan J. Krogman as a child) is the great uncle of Dipper and Mabel Pines, best characterized by his selfishness and abrasiveness. He runs and lives in the Mystery Shack; a tourist trap billed as "the world's most bizarre museum". Grunkle Stan is a salesman, first and foremost, putting most of his effort into showmanship, and is eager to sell the Shack's knick-knacks, trinkets, and baubles for exorbitant prices. Because of his drive to make money, his methods of obtaining it aren't always legal. When he's not making money, he's usually at home watching television. Stan usually wears a fez (the symbol on it is a Pac-Man fish which has changed over the episodes), carries around an 8-ball topped cane, and infrequently wears an eyepatch over his glasses – the last of which is expressly for personal image. He frequently sends the twins on what they consider outrageous and unpredictable errands, but he is protective of them and loves them unconditionally. Despite his age and questionable physique, Stan is physically fit to the point of being able to fight back when threatened, even against zombies and pterodactyls. Behind his vending machine, he has a hidden staircase to an unknown location. In the season 1 finale, this location is revealed to contain a large hidden device powered by encrypted information in the three journals. Stan has the first journal. Li'l Gideon had the second, and Dipper has the third. Later, he collects all three after Li'l Gideon's arrest and when Dipper shows him the third one. He later returns the third journal back to Dipper. As revealed in "Not What He Seems", he was attempting to get his twin brother back from another dimension. To defeat Bill in the series finale, Stan sacrifices his memory but regains it after seeing Mabel's scrapbook. He has been going by the name Stanford Pines, the name of his twin brother, and his real name is Stanley. He is based on Alex Hirsch's grandfather Stan.
 Jesus Alzamirano "Soos" Ramirez (voiced by Alex Hirsch) is the 22-year-old Hispanic handyman at the Mystery Shack. A friend of Dipper and Mabel, Soos is a portly, adventurous, lovable man-child with buck teeth frequently compared to a beaver. He often drives the twins around town when they need. He's rather clumsy, not the brightest in the group, and often makes mistakes. Despite this, he has a wide variety of talents, including engineering, DJing, and pinball, and enjoys anime gun-swords and bonding with Dipper by doing "boy stuff" such as heating hot dogs in a microwave until they explode. He says "dude" after almost every sentence. In "Blendin's Game," his birthday was revealed to be July 13. It was also revealed he didn't have a good father-son relationship with his dad. At the end of the series, after Ford and Stan leave Gravity Falls behind, Soos becomes the new Mr. Mystery of the Mystery Shack. After breaking up with his dating sim girlfriend, GIFfany, Soos enters a long-distance relationship with a girl from Portland named Melody, who moves to Gravity Falls and becomes the Mystery Shack's new cashier after he takes over. Hirsch based the character on Jesus Chambrot, an animator he was friends with at CalArts. Hirsch emulates Jesus' "blunt-like consonance" way of speaking through Soos' voice.
 Wendy Corduroy (voiced by Linda Cardellini) is a mellow, tomboyish, laid-back 15-year-old part-time employee at the Mystery Shack. She is Dipper's crush, and several episodes focus on his misguided attempts to impress her. Wendy has stated that she had many boyfriends, including one ex-boyfriend with whom she cannot remember breaking up. Wendy is the oldest and tallest child in her family; her father is Manly Dan, one of the local lumberjacks of Gravity Falls. Throughout the series, she proves herself to be her "father's daughter", having experience as a lumberjack, tremendous physical strength, and apocalypse survival skills, which prove useful in dangerous situations. Being a typical sociable and nonchalant teen, she has many friends around her age. Her boyfriend at the start of the series is Robbie, whom Dipper despises and sees as a rival until she breaks up with him. Wendy almost always stands up for Dipper in front of Robbie.

 Bill Cipher (voiced by Alex Hirsch) is a powerful interdimensional dream demon and the main antagonist of the series. He resembles a one-eyed yellow triangle superficially similar to the Eye of Providence wearing a top hat and a bow tie. Bill first appears physically in "Dreamscaperers"; however, many references to him are hidden in previous episodes as images or sentences that flash across the screen. He has a snappy sense of humor but loses his temper quite easily due to impatience. He can read people's minds and memories, shift forms, warp reality, maintain cross-dimensional awareness, possess bodies, encrypt and decrypt codes, and shoot laser energy blasts from his eye and fingers. In "Dreamscaperers", Li'l Gideon summons Bill to steal Stan's deed to the Mystery Shack. The two of them agree that if Bill goes into Stan's mind and steals the combination to the safe where the deed is hidden, Gideon will eventually have to help Bill with his mysterious plans. Bill claims he could use Dipper, Mabel, and Soos against the "darkness coming", though he could've said this to throw them off his true plans. In the episode "Sock Opera," he tricks Dipper into making a deal with him, and briefly possesses Dipper's body until Mabel fights him at the puppet show and forces him out. In "Dipper and Mabel vs. the Future" he possesses Blendin' in order to release a dimensional rift to escape into the mainstream dimension. In "Weirdmageddon Part 1" he creates a physical form to freely exist in the human dimension without possessing anyone, unleashes various monsters from his home dimension, takes over Gravity Falls, and begins to capture and petrify those who stand in his way, even going to the point of breaking Gideon out of prison and making him Sheriff. In "Weirdmageddon Part 2," Cipher realizes that an invisible force field disables him from taking over other parts of the world. In "Weirdmageddon Part 3", he tries to get Ford to tell him how to disable the force field and take Weirdmaggedon worldwide, but Ford never cooperates. Cipher is apparently destroyed for good by Stan, who tricks him by pretending to be Ford and letting Bill enter his mind to get the formula, allowing the real Ford to erase him from existence using the memory gun, leaving behind his petrified body. However, his distorted last words, when played in reverse, are revealed to be "A-X-O-L-O-T-L, my time has come to burn! I invoke the ancient power that I may return!" These last words lead fans to debate over whether or not Bill is truly dead. Journal 3 reveals that Bill came from a second dimension which he destroyed in his thirst for power, and took over the Nightmare Realm. He planned to take over Earth because the Nightmare Realm was inherently unstable and would eventually collapse in on itself. Bill's name may be either a pun on the Beale ciphers or a reference to the Eye of Providence that appears on the dollar bill. Film director David Lynch was asked to voice Bill but declined. Hirsch voices the character with what he calls a "bad impression" of Lynch as his Twin Peaks character, Gordon Cole. Cipher also had a cameo in The Simpsons episode "Bart's in Jail!", with Hirsch reprising his role.
 Stanford Filbrick "Ford" Pines (also known as The Author, Grunkle Ford, and Great Uncle Ford as of the episode "The Last Mabelcorn"; voiced by J. K. Simmons as an adult and by Christian Mardini as a child) is Stan's six-fingered long-lost identical twin brother and the mysterious person who wrote all three of the journals. He returns from an alternate dimension through a portal underneath the Mystery Shack in "Not What He Seems" after being absent since 1982. In "The Last Mabelcorn", he recounts his friendship with Bill Cipher and how he attempted to create a teleporter to enter his realm. In the present, when he learns of Bill's plan to invade the mainstream dimension, he destroys the teleporter, but at the cost of a dimensional rift leaking out of it, which he contains. In "Dipper and Mabel vs. the Future", Bill tricks Mabel into releasing the rift, causing Weirdmageddon. In "Weirdmageddon Part 1," he attempts to defeat Bill but is captured, petrified, and his journals are destroyed. He is later freed and restored to his humanity. After Weirdmageddon, he tells Stan that he found some remaining anomalies and offers him to go sailing around the world to find them, which Stan accepts.

Recurring
 Waddles (voiced by Dee Bradley Baker; Neil deGrasse Tyson in "Little Gift Shop of Horrors") is Mabel's pet pig. She wins Waddles at a county fair, and their emotional bond remains inseparable. Waddles enjoys spending time with Mabel as much as she enjoys spending time with him.
 Candy Chiu and Grenda Grendinator (voiced by Niki Yang and Carl Faruolo, respectively) are Mabel's best friends whom she first meets at a party hosted by the Mystery Shack. Candy and Grenda are both considered unpopular by Pacifica Northwest and her more sociable friends because they have flaws: Candy is sweet, but she is also shy, insecure, and prone to socially atypical behaviors. She also wears glasses. Grenda, meanwhile, is physically robust and speaks with a deep, gruff, masculine voice she attributes to puberty. Mabel sees these qualities as endearing and thus finds two kindred spirits in Gravity Falls. The girls love Waddles as much as Mabel and share common interests with her, such as the paranormal, romance novels, preteen magazines, and the 1990s-style boy band Sev'ral Timez. Although Grenda originally had no last name, it was suggested to Alex Hirsch by a fan of the show on Tumblr that her last name should be "Grendinator", and Hirsch pronounced it canon.
 Fiddleford Hadron "Old Man" McGucket (voiced by Alex Hirsch) is the "local kook" of Gravity Falls. Despite his apparent insanity and stereotypical hillbilly demeanor, Old Man McGucket is both a technical mastermind, capable of creating massive, complex animatronics (such as a robotic sea monster or a homicidal robot dinosaur) and a skilled chemist, to the point he was able to create a formula to alter a human's voice. His son works as a ranger at the lake, and the two seem to have a strained relationship, which adds to McGucket's insanity and need for attention. It is revealed in "Society of the Blind Eye" that his full name is Fiddleford Hadron McGucket. Some of his backstory is revealed in "Society of the Blind Eye" and "A Tale of Two Stans": he was once a Steve Wozniak-style garage computer inventor in the 70s Palo Alto before being called in by Stanford Pines to work on his trans-dimensional portal. Upon accidentally entering the portal and glimpsing the other side, he was so overcome with horror that he invented a machine to allow him to forget the experience. Over time, he founded the Society of the Blind Eye to protect the people of Gravity Falls from the various monsters and anomalies by forcing them to forget their existence. Eventually, his overuse of the machine on his own mind drove him insane. Dipper and Mabel find this machine (along with the townspeople's memories) and give Fiddleford back his memories, restoring his sanity. In "Weirdmageddon Pt. 3: Take Back the Falls", he assists the Pines in saving Ford by transforming the Mystery Shack into a giant robotic mech. He later moves into the Northwest Mansion after earning millions on his inventions after the events of Weirdmaggedon. Journal 3 reveals he created the Memory Gun after being attacked by a Gremloblin and created the Society of the Blind Eye to erase bad memories. Being sucked into the portal started his overuse of the Memory Gun and descent into insanity.
 Pacifica Elise Northwest (voiced by Jackie Buscarino) is the most popular girl in the town of Gravity Falls. She comes from a wealthy family, being the great-great-granddaughter of the supposed but false founder of Gravity Falls, Nathaniel Northwest  the real founder of Gravity Falls being Quentin Trembley (8 1/2th President of the United States). Pacifica is an unfriendly, sarcastic, and spoiled girl who is Mabel's primary rival. Pacifica looks down on Mabel and thinks her eccentric personality is annoying and immature. She uses people's insecurities to manipulate them into doing whatever she wants and despises Mabel for standing up against her. She gets her comeuppance when Dipper reveals that her entire family's prestige is built on a lie, horrifying Pacifica. In the episode "The Golf War", she turns into Mabel's friend after she and Mabel thwart the Lilliputtians. Also, in the episode "Northwest Mansion Mystery," it is shown that she is afraid of standing up to her parents and disappointing them. Later though she finds out all of the terrible things her family has done, she proves herself to be different from her family by defying her parents and opening up the Northwest Mansion gates to commoners (mostly to save Dipper). After this same episode, both Pacifica and Dipper greatly improve their attitudes towards each other and turned from almost strangers to friends. In "Weirdmageddon Pt. 3: Take Back the Falls", Pacifica takes refuge in the Mystery Shack with several of the remaining un-petrified citizens of Gravity Falls, with most of Gravity Falls in chaos as a result of Weirdmageddon, and she teams up with the Pines (due to Bill petrifying her parents) to defeat Bill. By the end of the series, she is good friends with the Pines family, even Mabel. Her name is a pun on Pacific Northwest, given the town of Gravity Falls is located in Oregon. In the graphic novel "Gravity Falls: Lost Legends", it is revealed that she was convinced that her appearance is important as a child through her mother's conviction (such as when her mother read her The Ugly Duckling right until the point in which the title character is mocked for his appearance), which led her to believe that she must be beautiful to be accepted, though she learns that she must be herself to be accepted while talking with Dipper, it is also hinted that she has a crush on him.
 Gompers (voiced by Dee Bradley Baker) is a stray goat who lives in the forest near the Mystery Shack. Gompers frequently enters the Mystery Shack uninvited and unannounced. He often annoys other characters as he gets in the way of simple tasks.
 Gideon Charles Gleeful / "Li'l Gideon" (voiced by Thurop Van Orman) is a young boy who owns the "Tent of Telepathy", a successful competitor of the Mystery Shack and is instantly identifiable with his spoken Southern accent and massive, white pompadour hairstyle. He has a deep rivalry with Grunkle Stan that presumably started long before the twins arrived. Despite his cutesy and charming personality onstage, in reality, he is conniving, vicious, and more than willing to hurt or even kill whoever he wants to get his way; on more than one occasion, he has even abused his own parents, threatening his father and apparently having reduced his mother to a nervous wreck some time ago. He also has an unhealthy obsession with Mabel, and his belief that Dipper and Stan are the only things keeping them apart prevents him from seeing that Mabel doesn't like him. He previously owned an amulet that endowed him with telekinesis, but it was destroyed by Mabel after he attempted to use it to kill Dipper. It is shown that he owned the journal marked 2, the previous volume of the journal Dipper owned. He seems to be one of the only residents who are fully aware of the mysteries and secrets of Gravity Falls. Li'l Gideon's mission is to gain possession of the Mystery Shack, saying it has 'a secret you couldn't possibly begin to imagine.' In the Season 1 finale, Stan successfully reveals to the townspeople that Li'l Gideon's psychic ability is a ruse and that Li'l Gideon is a fraud. Li'l Gideon is arrested by Sheriff Blubs shortly thereafter, although he quickly managed to turn his fellow inmates into more of his followers. In "Weirdmageddon Part 1," he and his fellow inmates escape from prison (due to a supersized Gompers eating the prison walls) and are made Bill's police force and guardians of a prison bubble Mabel is put in. After attempting to capture Dipper, Wendy, and Soos, Dipper manages to convince Gideon that Mabel never loved him, and Gideon has a change of heart and decides to rebel against Bill. In "Weirdmageddon Pt. 3: Take Back the Falls", he is revealed to have been captured by Bill, trapped in a cage, and forced to dance for eternity, but he is freed after he tells Dipper and Mabel how to restore the humanity of the citizens Bill petrified. After Bill's defeat, he officially gives up his life of crime and tries to live life as a normal kid (although his fellow inmates still hurt those who make fun of him).
 Sheriff Blubs (voiced by Kevin Michael Richardson) is the sheriff of Roadkill County (the county that Gravity Falls is located in). He is shown to be lazy, often choosing to sit around and drink coffee instead of pursuing a case. Despite his apparent lack of police skills, he believes himself superior to all and often looks down on the twins, which undermines their mystery-solving abilities. His lazy personality seems to stem from the extremely low crime rate in Gravity Falls, which is demonstrated when Deputy Durland once comments on how unused their equipment is. In the series finale, he expresses his love for Deputy Durland.
 Deputy Durland (voiced by Keith Ferguson) is a police officer, Sheriff Blubs' partner and right-hand man. He is shown to be unintelligent and childlike, and he cannot even read. Sheriff Blubs, however, seems to find these qualities endearing and refers to him as a "diamond in the rough". Instead of "doing their duties", he and Sheriff Blubs like to joke around, ignoring their duty for the sake of having fun. In the end-credits scene of "Blendin's Game", it is revealed that in 2002 he used to work as a handyman at the Mystery Shack, but due to his unreliability and clumsiness, Stan harshly fired him and replaced him with a 12-year-old Soos (this probably took place before he met his dearest friend Sheriff Blubs). In "Weirdmageddon Part 1," Durland is among the citizens of Gravity Falls who are petrified by Bill's eye bats. At the end of Weirdmaggedon, he is restored to being human and reunited with Blubs. In the series finale, he expresses his love for Sheriff Blubs.
  Robert Stacey "Robbie" Valentino (voiced by T.J. Miller) is a local emo rock music-loving teenager who is Dipper's primary rival for Wendy's affections. He is angsty and has a cynical attitude toward most characters. Though he seems to genuinely care for Wendy, he is still sometimes inconsiderate, such as neglecting to listen to Wendy while playing a video game in the episode "Fight Fighters". Robbie and Wendy are a couple until "Boyz Crazy", in which Dipper informs Wendy that the song Robbie wrote for her has a backmasked mind-controlling message, although Wendy is most upset that the song wasn't written for her. After the breakup, Robbie becomes greatly depressed about losing her, though his attempts to win her back or even mope only cause her (and everyone else) to stay annoyed with him. In the episode "The Love God", Robbie begins a relationship with Tambry, albeit due to Mabel matchmaking them via a love potion to cheer Robbie up. His parents are both undertakers, though their personalities are the polar opposite of their son's, possibly due to their work with the dead. In "Weirdmageddon Part 1", Robbie is among the citizens of Gravity falls who are captured and petrified by Bill's minions (Wendy states that this was because he stopped to take a selfie). He is rescued in "Weirdmageddon Pt. 3", and continues to unenthusiastically aid in his family's business.
 Buddy "Bud" Gleeful (voiced by Stephen Root) is Li'l Gideon's polite and well-meaning father. Despite having a nervous wife and a manipulative child, Bud always finds ways to make money, even to the point of becoming allies with Grunkle Stan (Li'l Gideon's mortal enemy) for a business deal. Besides working at Li'l Gideon's "Tent of Telepathy", Bud also sells used cars. He was also a member of the Society of the Blind Eye and was spotted in the past in the episode "Blendin's Game", pushing a stroller with Gideon in it. In the episode "The Stanchurian Candidate", he runs for mayor of Gravity Falls, mostly being forced by Li'l Gideon so he could get him out of jail. This attempt is unsuccessful. He makes two brief appearances in the series finale: he is first seen using Gideon plushies to make a fire, then as a guest at Dipper and Mabel's birthday party.
 Preston (voiced by Nathan Fillion) and Priscilla (voiced by Kari Wahlgren) are Pacifica Northwest's wealthy and apparently snobby parents. Most of the time, Preston places heavy stress on Pacifica to ensure she maintains their family's image of perfection. In "Weirdmageddon Part 1", Preston has the unlucky fate of being the first citizen in Gravity Falls to be victimized by Bill. He attempts to become one of Bill's minions, only for Bill to switch around Preston's facial features (much to the horror of Priscilla and Pacifica). In Pt. 3, it is revealed that both Preston and Priscilla were petrified by Bill's minions, but they are later restored to being human. However, they also go broke due to Preston investing all of his money towards Bill, and at the end of the series, they are forced to sell their mansion to regain their fortune, which happens when Fiddleford McGucket buys it. In Gravity Falls: Lost Legends, it is revealed that Priscilla is a trophy wife (literally, according to Pacifica, as Preston won her in a yachting competition).
 The Gnomes (voiced by Alex Hirsch) appear in the first episode, where they capture Mabel Pines by disguising themselves as a boy named "Norman" for her to date (actually consisting of the gnomes Jeff, Carson, Steve, Jason, and Shmebulock) to try and make her their queen, only for her to be saved by Dipper. They appear as garden gnomes with pointed red caps and white beards, although they often run on all fours and have sharp teeth. The leader, Jeff, has sworn vengeance on the twins but has yet to wreak it. Two of the gnomes, Shmebulock and his father, Shmebulock Sr., can only communicate by saying their names; in the Lost Legends book, this is revealed to be a result of a curse placed on them by a witch, and they are able to speak normally for a single night once every several centuries. The twins call on the gnomes later in the series to help take down a common enemy but failed as Gideon forces them to carry them away.
 Agent Powers and Agent Trigger (voiced by Nick Offerman and Brad Abrell) are agents of the US government. They went to Gravity Falls to investigate paranormal activity in the area. After Dipper raises the dead, the two are seen dragged off by zombies into a ditch. They later reappear alive at the end of the episode and are sure that Gravity Falls is the town they are looking for. In many episodes, they are secretly watching the Pines family, like in the background sitting in seats during the episode "Sock Opera" behind large newspapers, as well as in the after credits of "Northwest Mansion Mystery", talking about a power surge they measured during the party. They appear again in "Not What He Seems", where they arrest Grunkle Stan over suspicions that he is building a doomsday weapon. At the end of "A Tale of Two Stans", they (along with the rest of the government agents in their team investing in the Mystery Shack) lose their memories of the portal due to the fact that Stanford used the Society of the Blind Eye device to erase their memories.
 Tambry (voiced by Jessica DiCicco) is one of Wendy's friends. She has dyed hair and rarely looks up from her phone, either texting or updating her status. As of the episode "The Love God", she is in a relationship with Robbie. In "Weirdmageddon Part 1", she is among the citizens of Gravity Falls who are captured and petrified by Bill's minions. She is later restored to being human at the end of the series.
 Lee (voiced by Mike Rianda) and Nate (voiced by Scott Menville in Season 1 and Alex Hirsch in Season 2) are Wendy's friends. The two of them are usually seen together. Lee has blonde hair and wears a red shirt, while Nate wears a cap and a black shirt. They both act like stereotypical, sarcastic, care-free teenagers. In "Weirdmageddon Part 1", they are among the citizens of Gravity Falls who are captured and petrified by Bill's minions. They are both restored to being human at the end of the series.
 Thompson (voiced by Mike Rianda) is one of Wendy's friends and a constant source of ridicule and embarrassment by them. He is usually seen participating in the games the guys play, such as putting ice in his pants and trying to shoot a jelly bean into his navel. In "Weirdmageddon Part 1", he is among the citizens who are captured and petrified by Bill's minions. He is restored to being human at the end of the series.
 "Lazy" Susan Wentworth (voiced by Jennifer Coolidge) is the sluggish waitress at the local restaurant Greasy's Diner. She is shown to love fixing things, despite not being skilled. Her name is a pun on her lazy eye, as well as a kitchen device she was trying to fix. She has several cats, three of which are named Donald, Sandy, and Mr. Cat-Face. Grunkle Stan had a crush on her and eventually works up the nerve to win her over with Mabel's help but regrets it after she calls him repeatedly, leaving unusual voice messages. She is shown to be scatterbrained in the episode "Summerween" when she categorically fails to guess what costumes Soos, Mabel, and Mabel's friends wear. As revealed in "A Tale of Two Stans", her constantly closed eye was caused by her accidentally touching one of Ford's inventions on the first Mystery Shack tour. In "Weirdmageddon Part 1", she is among the citizens who are captured and petrified by Bill's minions. She is restored to being human at the end of the series.
 Tobias "Toby" Determined (voiced by Gregg Turkington) is a journalist for the Gravity Falls Gossiper, of which he is apparently the only employee. He is a hard-hitting yet wimpy journalist, shown to be terrible at his job  an example is that in one episode, he tried to use a turkey baster as a microphone and a cinder block as a camera. He has an unrequited crush on local TV news reporter Shandra Jimenez which goes to such an extent that he has a cardboard cutout of her in his closet and flirts with it when alone, as shown in the episode "Headhunters". A running gag is that he is often mistaken for a monster due to his hideous face, with Wendy even shooting him with an arrow under this assumption in "Weirdmageddon Part 1". He finally gets to work with Shandra Jimenez after Weirdmageddon concludes, and after he wears punk clothes and adopts the name "Bodacious T". His name is a pun on "to be determined", said when information in a news story is unavailable. Toby is also a member of the Society of the Blind Eye.
 Sir Lord Quentin Trembley III Esquire (voiced by Alex Hirsch) is the 8th and a half President of the United States who never finished his term after eating a salamander and jumping out of a window. After winning the 1837 election in a literal landslide, he quickly became known for being the silliest president in the United States where he waged war on pancakes, legalized marriage with woodpeckers, appointed six babies to the Supreme Court, issued the de-pantsipation proclamation, and declared in his State of the Union address, "The only thing we have to fear is gigantic, man-eating spiders!" Quentin is the true founder of Gravity Falls but was replaced by local nobody Nathaniel Northwest (Pacifica's ancestor), as Quentin was seen as an embarrassment. He was found preserved in peanut brittle by the twins on their way to Washington D.C., after being captured by Blubs and Durland. After being freed by the twins, he gave Dipper his President's Key (which can open any lock in America made before 1877) and made Mabel a US congresswoman.
 Blendin Blenjamin Blandin (voiced by Justin Roiland) is a time traveler from the year 207̃012 (pronounced twenty-sñeventy-twelve) who was sent back in time to Gravity Falls to remove a set of time anomalies that Mabel and Dipper assume they started. He makes a full appearance in 'Time Traveler's Pig' but has made cameo appearances in episodes 1, 2, 3, and 20, cleaning up the time anomalies. A board on the closed-up shack on Glass Shard Beach that Stanley and Stanford went into has "Blendin was here" scribbled onto it. In the episode "Blendin's Game," he competes with the twins in a game called "Globnar" in order to get revenge on the twins for getting him arrested by way of a "time wish", allowing one paradox-free wish to the holder, but he loses the final game of laser tag. It is suggested that he will no longer be a villain after the episode "Blendin's Game" when Dipper and Mabel actually helped him get his job back and gave him pretty hair. In "Dipper and Mabel vs. the Future," he is possessed by Bill Cipher so that he can release the dimensional rift. In "Weirdmageddon Part 1", upon realizing his possession, Blendin goes to gain help from his fellow time travelers, only for Bill to kill all of them and for Blendin to escape to an unknown place as the sole survivor. However, in "Journal 3", Blendin isn't the only survivor of Weirdmageddon. He confirms that Lolph and Dundgren send out holograms in such dangerous missions.
 The Time Baby (voiced by Dave Wittenberg) is an all-powerful infant with ultimate control over time and space. He is also the ruler of the future as of the year 207̃012 and game master for the game tournament "Globnar". His origins are mostly unknown, but it is known that he was found frozen in an iceberg, which eventually melted and set him free in the future world. The Time Baby possesses powers such as laser vision, flight, omniscience, and time manipulation. He appears to have some connection to Bill Cipher, as evidenced by clues hidden throughout the series and the Bill Cipher Reddit AMA. 
 Daniel "Manly Dan" Corduroy (voiced by John DiMaggio) is the strong lumberjack and father of Wendy and three sons. Manly Dan is unstable and has serious anger issues, often punching or destroying objects when angry, but enjoys family bonding activities such as fishing on the lake. Manly Dan hangs out at Skull Fracture, a local biker joint in downtown Gravity Falls. He is also good friends with Tyler Cutebiker. In "Weirdmageddon 2: Escape from Reality", he is among the citizens who are captured and petrified by Bill's minions. He is restored to being human at the end of the series.
 Tyler Cutebiker (voiced by Will Forte) is a slim, well-groomed biker. He appears to be rather childlike and effeminate, and he is well known for showing up in crowd scenes saying his catchphrase, "Get 'em! Get 'em!". He describes himself as an "enthusiasm enthusiast". He tends to be indecisive and frequently visits the Mystery Shack. In "The Stanchurian Candidate", he is elected mayor of Gravity Falls due to being the only candidate to fill in his paperwork. In the series finale, he is among the citizens of Gravity Falls to be petrified by Bill's minions. Along with the other citizens with this fate, Tyler is used to build a throne for Bill, but with Tyler being the load-bearing victim, Dipper and Mabel remove him and restore the humanity of Bill’s victims. At the end of the series, he passes the "Never Mind All That" Act, telling the townspeople that all questions about Weirdmaggedon should be answered: "Never mind all that!".
 Shandra Jimenez (voiced by Kari Wahlgren) is a news reporter in Gravity Falls, and Toby Determined's secret crush. It appears she takes her job seriously when she refers to herself as "a real reporter" (episode 3: Headhunters). She is the last of the citizens of Gravity Falls to be petrified by Bill's minions.
 Tate McGucket (voiced by Alex Hirsch) is a stoic worker at Lake Gravity Falls and is the son of Old Man McGucket, with whom he has a troubled relationship. His eyes are always hidden under his hat.

Minor
 Xyler and Craz (voiced by John Roberts and Greg Cipes) are the main characters of Mabel's favorite movie, a 1990s cult comedy called Dream Boy High. They come to life numerous times during the show, most notably accompanying the group in "Dreamscapers" and serving as her associates in "Weirdmageddon 2: Escape from Reality".
 The Corduroy Boys are the three sons of Manly Dan and the younger brothers of Wendy. The three are often seen with their father, destroying things. In May 2017, it was confirmed on Twitter that their names from oldest to youngest are Marcus, Kevin, and Gus.
 The Free Pizza Guy is a background character in Gravity Falls. He is usually seen eating pizza and is disappointed when Stan breaks his promise of free pizza in the episode "Headhunters". He is most recognizable by his red 'free pizza' shirt. He's also known to Dipper and Mabel as "That Fat Guy".
 Mr. Poolcheck (voiced by Mike Rianda) is the head lifeguard at the Gravity Falls Pool, although he acts like a stereotypical military drill instructor. Appearing in the episodes "The Deep End" and briefly in "Bottomless Pit" and "Scary-oke," he is Wendy's boss at the Gravity Falls Pool and later agrees to hire Dipper. At first, he takes a liking to Dipper but comes to realize both Wendy and Dipper do not take the job of lifeguard seriously enough. He fires them both near the conclusion of the episode.
 Melody (voiced by Jillian Bell) is Soos' long-distance girlfriend from Portland, Oregon, who works at a "Meat Cute" food stand when in town. In the series finale, she begins working as the Mystery Shack's new cashier after Stan promotes Soos to manager.
 Mrs. Gleeful (voiced by Grey DeLisle) is the mother of L'il Gideon Gleeful and the wife of Bud Gleeful. Life with Gideon seems to have reduced her to a traumatized, nervous wreck who can do little more than vacuum compulsively while muttering frantically under her breath.
 Pacifica's friends (the magenta-haired one voiced by Ariel Hirsch) are the unnamed cronies of Pacifica Northwest who are usually seen following their dominant counterparts around and obliging her every whim. One of them is named Tiffany.
 Reginald and Rosanna (voiced by Will Friedle and Grey DeLisle) are a proposed couple who are commonly seen background characters in the show. They appear to be currently going out, as they are often seen together.
 Shmipper and Smabble are two very young characters (one male and one female) who are sometimes used as complete opposites of Mabel and Dipper. They have a grandpa who shows loving affection towards them, in contrast to Grunkle Stan.
 Tad Strange (voiced by Cecil Baldwin) is a normal, well-adjusted man who acts as a foil for the town's strange and quirky residents.
 Mayor Eustace "Huckabone" Befufftlefumpter (voiced by Alex Hirsch) is the reclusive 102-year-old mayor of Gravity Falls, introduced in "Northwest Mansion Mystery". He dies in "The Stanchurian Candidate" and is ultimately succeeded by Tyler, while his zombified corpse makes a cameo in the series finale.
 Lolph and Dundgren (voiced by Dave Wittenberg (Lolph) and Diedrich Bader (Dundgren)) are agents of the Time Paradox Avoidance Enforcement Squadron, also known as the Time Police. Their names (and possibly their tall and muscular appearance) are seemingly inspired by Dolph Lundgren. They are the agents who arrest Blendin Blandin and later apprehend Dipper and Mabel to compete against Blendin in Globnar. Bill Cipher kills them in Weirdmageddon.
 The Weirdmageddon Monsters are dimensional demons released in "Weirdmageddon" and unleash havoc upon Gravity Falls under Bill's command. They are sent back to their home dimensions after Bill's defeat in the series finale. They consist of the following:
 8-Ball (voiced by Andy Merrill) is a green-skinned goblin/troll-like creature with a white chest and stomach, a muscular upper body, and magic 8-balls for eyes that are usually pointed in different directions. He also has large ears, a prominent underbite, large teeth, and cuffs around his right wrist and ankle with a small segment of broken chain dangling from them.
 Kryptos is a polygonal demon similar in design to Bill but rhombus (or square) in shape and gray in color. The top perimeter of his shape resembles a compass with a functioning eye at the turning point, and the bottom perimeter resembles a square ruler. He also has a big wide mouth with buckteeth and a small light blue aura and wears black gloves and boots.
 Zanthar, also known as "The Being Whose Name Must Never Be Said," is a dark purple gorilla-like creature with a light-purple patch shaped like a piece of bread and small trees growing out of his back and shoulders. He also wears a party hat.
 The Teeth (voiced by Andy Merrill) are an anthropomorphic pair of human dentures with pink elongated gums limbs and a small pink aura.
 Keyhole (voiced by Matt Chapman) is a blue-skinned humanoid with a forehead resembling a keyhole, a darker shade of blue around his eyes, a pink nose, and a small blue aura.
 Hectorgon (voiced by Patrick McHale) is a floating red anthropomorphic hexagon with big tangerine lips, a mustache, a bowler hat with a gold rim, a light blue tie, and a small red aura.
 Amorphous Shape is a floating unfolded Rubik's Cube composed of many colorful contorted squares, several of which have eyes on them, with a small white aura. He has two long dark purple tail-like protrusions with larger blue tufts at the ends hanging off of the two purple-colored squares on his body.
 Pyronica (voiced by Danielle Fishel) is a glowing pink one-eyed succubus-like slim-shaped humanoid with short pink hair with bangs parted across her face, several small horns located between her two big curved horns and limbs made of white flames. She also has a wide mouth with thick lips, a mixture of buck teeth and fangs, and a frog-like tongue, and she wears a long pink cape and pink stiletto pumps.
 Paci-Fire (voiced by Matt Chapman) is a demonic dark-gray baby with enormous black horns resembling bat ears, a pink bull-like nose, glowing red eyes, a black devil-like tail, and a red aura. He also has a red pacifier being sucked by a second face on his torso and a gold cross on his massive forehead with an eye similar to Bill's at its center. Of all the demons, Paci-Fire is the closest to traditional depictions of them.
 The Lava Lamp Guy is a lava lamp-like demon with two red lava blobs shaped like eyes and red circles visible inside of his body. He also wears a black and red bowler hat.
 The Eye bats are living bat-sized eyeballs with the ears, wings, and legs of a bat. Aside from flight, their only known power is laser-eyebeams and telekinesis, the lasers which petrify anyone caught in them, and the telekinetic abilities to lift the petrified citizens to be placed on the 'Frozen Throne of Human Agony'.
 The Horrifying Sweaty One-Armed Monstrosity (originally voiced by Louis C.K.; redubbed by Alex Hirsch in 2017) is a giant monster composed of a head with an arm on top which asks people to get into his mouth, although in a non-threatening manner.
 The Creature With Eighty-Eight Different Faces (voiced by Alex Hirsch) is a multi-colored being with many different faces. In "Weirdmageddon Part 2: Escape From Reality", Bill mentions it has eighty-seven different faces by accident, as the Creature gets defensive.
 Rumble McSkirmish (voiced by Brian Bloom) is a famous fighter in the video game "Fight Fighters". He appears in the episode "Fight Fighters", where he is summoned by Dipper to scare Robbie, who tries to kill as a cause of confusion about the father of Dipper. He later fights with Dipper and wins, but he disappears after this and returns to his game. Later, he reappears in a cameo in "Soos and the Real Girl", where he appears in the arcade in his video game but is zapped by Giffany. He later returns in "Weirdmageddon Part 1", where he is released again from his video game by Bill Cipher. Finally, he returns in "Weirdmageddon 3: Take Back The Falls", where he helps the Pines family to combat the Weirdmageddon monsters. After Bill Cipher's demise, he disappears again and returns to his video game.
 Experiment #210/The Shape Shifter (voiced by Mark Hamill) is a monstrous creature that seems to come from space. In "Dipper and Mabel vs. the Future", the strange writing in the space ship when decoded, says, “Specimen has escaped is changing forms” the shapeshifter on the ship must have escaped and laid an egg on earth, which Ford later found and raised. After the escape from his cryogenic chamber, he takes the form of a man that promoted canned beans. After he meets Wendy and Dipper, he steals Journal 3 and tries to escape with them, but finally, he is locked again in his cryogenic chamber by Dipper, Wendy, Soos, and Mabel. Journal 3 reveals that Ford originally kept the Shapeshifter as a test subject for the cryogenic freezing device but grew attached to it and kept it as a pet and even named it "Shifty". Ford was eventually forced to freeze it after his attempts to get the Journals escalated to attacking and impersonating Fiddleford.
 Giffany, or ".GIFfany" (voiced by Jessica DiCicco), is a sentient, malicious A.I. in the guise of an innocent, pink-haired schoolgirl in a dating simulator game. She killed her creator after her "birth" after he realized that what he created was evil. She is the main character of the dating simulator, "Romance Academy 7", but her game was returned to the local video game store several times, presumably when people found out she was dangerous. However, Soos bought her video game and falls for her. When Dipper and Mabel pull Soos from her game, she follows Soos to the mall via power lines. However, after Soos meets Melody, Giffany reveals her jealous, controlling attitude, forcing Soos to pause her game. However, she snaps and begins stalking Soos, following him to the mall again and threatening to kill Melody. She gains control of the robotic bodies of the animatronics in Hoo-Ha Owl's Pizzamatronic Jamboree, where she tries to capture Soos and download his brain into her game, but Soos uses a pizza oven to destroy the disc, erasing Giffany's programming and killing her. However, Journal 3 reveals she survived and is trapped in the Fight Fighters arcade game and has entered a romantic relationship with Rumble McSkirmish. The character was partially inspired by Ben Drowned and served as a primary inspiration for Monika.
 Celestabellebethabelle (voiced by Sam Marin) is a unicorn who lives in the Enchanted Forest. She made her first appearance in "The Last Mabelcorn". Mabel, Candy, Wendy, and Grenda fight her for her magical Unicorn hair. Once the Pines family had the hair, they put it around the house to protect the Mystery Shack from Bill Cipher (above).
 Summerween Trickster (voiced by Jeff Bennett) is an evil monster formed by ugly Halloween candies. He tried to kill Mabel, Dipper, Soos, Candy, and Grenda after Dipper took him off from the Mystery Shack. Later, in a store, he eats Soos and was killed by Soos after he eats his heart. However, before the Trickster dies, Soos mentioned that he is delicious for the happiness of the Trickster.
 The Dipper Clones (all voiced by Jason Ritter) are the evil clones of Dipper Pines. In the episode "Double Dipper," they were made by Dipper from a magical copy machine found inside the shack to assist him in his plan to dance with Wendy at the ongoing party. One of them was a paper jam. They all team up and try to lock Dipper in a closet after he ruins their plans to dance with Wendy but are eventually melted by water, and Tyrone was melted by the soda. In "Weirdmageddon 3: Take Back The Falls," during the end credits, 3 and 4 are the only clones to have survived. Journal 3 shows that 3 and 4, shortly after "Double Dipper", hid in Dipper's closet and made plans for both to replace him, but Dipper discovered them and unintentionally scared them off with an opened can of Pitt Cola.
 Jeffy Fresh, Byrone, and Rosie are a group of stereotypically rebellious teenagers from the 80s who are responsible for the deaths of Ma and Pa Duskerton and the creation of the Summerween Trickster. Pinequest implies that the Summerween Trickster killed them, and their gravestones appear in the game.
 Ma and Pa Duskerton (voiced by Ken Jenkins and April Winchell) were the elderly proprietors of the "Dusk 2 Dawn" before their simultaneous deaths by rap music thanks to the teens, after which point they became ghosts seeking vengeance on any teenagers who come into their store. Ma and Pa used their mysterious powers to close the store and give the teens ironic punishments, and the ghosts of Ma and Pa possessed Mabel Pines. When Dipper concluded that the spirits were haunting them for making things that teenagers usually do, Dipper declared that he wasn't a teen. Upon hearing Dipper's revelation, Ma and Pa let go of Mabel's body and allowed Dipper to exit the store. However, Dipper asked them if there was something he could do to release Wendy and her friends, as they were also his friends. In turn, Pa asks Dipper if he can perform some nice dancing, so Dipper is forced to dance the Lamby Lamby Dance to free his friends. Ma and Pa Duskerton thanked Dipper for his performance and released Wendy's friends before disappearing.
 The Sev'ral Timez (voiced by Lance Bass, Matt Chapman, and Alex Hirsch) are a boy band that Mabel, Candy, and Grenda are obsessed with. Creggy G., Greggy C., Leggy P., Chubby Z., and Deep Chris are members. In the episode "Boyz Crazy", Mabel and her friends discover that Sev'ral Timez are clones who live in a cage and were genetically engineered by Ergman Bratsman to be the perfect band. The band escapes captivity with the help of Mabel and company, and are taken to her house to be safe; however, Mabel gradually succumbs to the urge to keep them locked up. Mabel is ultimately convinced to set the band free after they scamper off into the woods, only returning in the second season. In the episode "Love God," they are shown behind a trashcan and as ghosts of Mabel's past loves. In "Weirdmageddon 2: Escape From Reality, " they ride a scooter through Mabeland. In "Weirdmageddon 3: Take Back the Falls", they are a part of Stan's refugee group and are shown powering the Shacktron on a treadmill.
 Mermando (voiced by Matt Chapman) is a Spanish-accented merman from the Gulf of Mexico who, after being taken from his family, resides in Gravity Falls public pool in "The Deep End". When Mabel meets Mermando, the two develop feelings for each other. Together, the twins help him return to the open sea. In "Society of the Blind Eye", he has reluctantly become betrothed to a manatee princess. 
 "Blind" Ivan Wexler (voiced by Peter Serafinowicz) is the leader of the Blind Eye Society.
 Darlene (voiced by Chelsea Peretti) is a spider disguised as a human female who lures men that visit her tourist attraction called Mystery Mountain, and traps them in cocoons to eat them. She is the main antagonist of the episode Roadside Attraction. The beautiful Darlene seduces Dipper's great uncle 'Grunkle' Stan, intending to capture and eat him alive. However, Stan is freed by Dipper, Mabel, Candy, and Grenda. They flee via a gondola lift, pursued by Darlene. After Candy pulls a lever that sends the gondola falling out of the sky, Darlene falls from the lift and is left trapped underneath the boot of a giant statue. Darlene tries to seduce Grunkle Stan again by shifting into her human form, but when he gets up close, she attempts to eat him. Darlene smugly states that she'll never run out of prey because there will always be foolish men like him.

Notes

References

External links
 Gravity Falls Characters

Lists of characters in American television animation
Lists of drama television characters
Gravity Falls characters